Frederick Melvin "Fish" Ellis (February 26, 1906 – July 19, 1967) was an American sportsman who played football, basketball, baseball, and track at Tufts University. He was also an athletics coach, administrator, and university professor at Tufts. Ellis is the namesake of Tufts' home football field, the Ellis Oval. He is regarded by many as one of the greatest athletes in Tufts history.

Early life and playing career
Ellis was born in 1906 in Norwood, Massachusetts. His family moved to Gloucester and then to Medford, where Ellis attended Medford High School, graduating in 1925. Ellis entered Tufts University that fall, majoring in civil engineering. Ellis lettered in four sports – football, basketball, baseball, and track – at Tufts, from which he graduated in 1929. He was the first Tufts student to earn varsity letters in four sports. In the summers of 1928 and 1929, he played for Orleans in the Cape Cod Baseball League.

Ellis is best remembered for his time playing football. He played quarterback for the Tufts football team from 1926 to 1928, scoring a school-record 181 points. That record stood until 2016, when Shayne "Chance" Brady finished his Tufts career with 210 points. Ellis led the 1927 squad to an undefeated season, with the Jumbos posting a perfect 8–0 record.

Ellis' future wife, Dorothea Loughlin, attended Jackson College – the women's college associated with Tufts – from 1927 to 1931 and played on the Jackson baseball team.

Later life
For a period of time after graduating, Ellis coached at Dean Academy. His stint included a period of time during which the team assembled three consecutive undefeated seasons.

Ellis eventually returned to Medford and served as the head football coach at Tufts from 1946 to 1953, compiling a record of 25–34–6. He was also the head basketball coach from 1946 to 1953, tallying a mark of 74–75. In 1954, Ellis became a full professor and the chairman of Tufts' Department of Physical Education.

Death and honors
Ellis died of a heart attack at the age of 61 on July 19, 1967, at his home in Burlington, Massachusetts. He was survived by Dorothea and their two daughters, Faith and Susan, both of whom graduated from Tufts (as did their husbands). Dorothea passed away on October 14, 2011.

The football field at Tufts University was named in his honor as Frederick M. Ellis Oval at homecoming in 1969. The Frederick M. Ellis Prize Scholarship at Tufts is named in his memory. On April 21, 2018, Ellis was a member of the inaugural class inducted into the Tufts University Athletics Hall of Fame.

Head coaching record

Football

References

1906 births
1967 deaths
American football quarterbacks
American men's basketball players
Baseball players from Massachusetts
Basketball coaches from Massachusetts
Basketball players from Massachusetts
Tufts Jumbos athletic directors
Tufts Jumbos baseball players
Tufts Jumbos football coaches
Tufts Jumbos football players
Tufts Jumbos men's basketball coaches
Cape Cod Baseball League players (pre-modern era)
Orleans Firebirds players
College men's basketball head coaches in the United States
College golf coaches in the United States
College men's track and field athletes in the United States
People from Burlington, Massachusetts
Sportspeople from Gloucester, Massachusetts
Sportspeople from Medford, Massachusetts
People from Norwood, Massachusetts
Sportspeople from Middlesex County, Massachusetts
Sportspeople from Norfolk County, Massachusetts
Coaches of American football from Massachusetts
Players of American football from Massachusetts
Tufts University faculty
Tufts University School of Engineering alumni
United States Army Air Forces officers
United States Army Air Forces personnel of World War II
Military personnel from Massachusetts